Cordarro Law (born October 15, 1988) is a Canadian football defensive lineman for the Toronto Argonauts of the Canadian Football League (CFL). He played college football for Southern Mississippi. He was signed by the Seattle Seahawks as an undrafted free agent in 2012. He has also been a member of the San Diego Chargers and Calgary Stampeders.

College career 
Law played four seasons with the Southern Mississippi Golden Eagles. For his career, he recorded 191 tackles, including 54 tackles for loss, and 27.5 sacks. Law set a school record with 14 career forced fumbles. He was a first-team all-Conference USA selection in 2011 and a second-team selection in 2010.

Collegiate statistics

Professional career

Seattle Seahawks
After going undrafted in the 2012 NFL Draft, Law signed as a free agent by the Seattle Seahawks but was later released prior to the start of the regular season.

Calgary Stampeders
Law signed with the Calgary Stampeders of the Canadian Football League (CFL) on October 1, 2012; nearing the end of the 2012 CFL season. He played in 3 games that season and recorded 2 quarterback sacks. The following year proved to be a breakout season for Law, as he played in 16 of the 18 regular season games, tallying 41 tackles and 14 sacks.

As a pending free agent, Law had a workout with the Baltimore Ravens (NFL) in December 2014.

San Diego Chargers
He signed with the San Diego Chargers on February 14, 2014. He was released on August 30, 2014 but signed to the Chargers' practice squad a day later. On September 23, 2014 Cordarro Law was promoted to the active roster due to injuries at the outside linebacker position. Law debuted against the Jacksonville Jaguars recording a sack, a pass defense, and 2 tackles. Cordarro Law ended his first NFL season with the Chargers with 9 tackles, 1 sack, and a pass defense. During his first preseason game in the 2015 season against the Dallas Cowboys, he had a sack and 2 tackle for losses. He played in 14 games in 2015 and recorded 12 tackles.

Calgary Stampeders (II) 
Signed as a free agent with the Stampeders on September 28, 2016. During his first season back in the CFL Law played four games and had nine tackles including a tackle for a loss and three sacks and added one fumble recovery. He started in the Western Final and had two sacks and also started in the Grey Cup recorded one tackle and one knockdown. Following the season he was re-signed by be the Stampeders to a contract extension, preventing him from becoming a free agent in February 2017. Law sustained a lower-body injury in the Stamps second preseason game of 2017. On June 13, 2017, it was announced that an MRI had revealed Law sustained a broken ankle and ligament damage. He missed the entire 2017 season as a result of the injury. He played in nine regular season games in 2018 and both post-season games as he became a Grey Cup champion following the Stampeders' 106th Grey Cup win.

Toronto Argonauts 
As a pending free agent entering the 2021 CFL season, Law's playing rights were traded to the Toronto Argonauts on January 31, 2021. On February 4, 2021, the Argonauts announced that they had signed Law.

References

External links
Toronto Argonauts bio
San Diego Chargers bio
Seattle Seahawks bio
Southern Miss Golden Eagles bio

1988 births
Living people
Players of American football from Alabama
American football linebackers
Canadian football defensive linemen
American players of Canadian football
Southern Miss Golden Eagles football players
Seattle Seahawks players
Calgary Stampeders players
San Diego Chargers players
Toronto Argonauts players